Adrian Cunnningham (born 1960) is an Australian archivist who worked for many years at the National Archives of Australia.  He is known for his contributions to the practice of digital records management, including development of international standards in this field.

Career

Adrian Cunnningham was born in Brisbane, Australia, in 1960.
In 1981 he became a qualified librarian in Sydney, Australia.
He started his career as a specialist in manuscripts at the Mitchell Library of New South Wales.
He transferred to the National Library of Australia in Canberra, at first as a manuscript specialist, then managing the oral history section, working in the National Preservation Office, leading the international relations unit and taking part in national collaborative projects.

Cunnningham worked as an archivist at the Pacific Manuscripts Bureau and as a librarian at the State Library of New South Wales.
He managed Electronic Services Delivery for the Office of Government Information Technology.
In 1988 he transferred to the National Archives of Australia (NAA) as director of recordkeeping standards and policies.
After seven years in this role he was made responsible for strategic relations and personal records at the NAA.
As Director, Strategic Relations and Personal Records he was responsible for collaborations between the NAA and domestic and international partners in government, industry, the professions and academia.
His primary concern was digital recordkeeping and other computer-related initiatives.

In 2011 Cunnningham became director of the Digital Archives Program at the Queensland State Archives. Later, he also assumed  responsibility for government recordkeeping.
In 2016 Cunningham was Queensland's state archivist for six months.
Cunningham retired from the Queensland State Archives in January 2017.

Other activities

Cunnningham has held positions in various archives-related organizations:
 President, Convenor and Fellow of the Australian Society of Archivists
 Secretary of the International Council on Archives (ICA) Committee on Descriptive Standards
 Treasurer of the Pacific Regional Branch of the ICA
 Member of Standards Australia’s Committee IT/21, Records Management
 Member of UNESCO's Australian Memory of the World Committee.

Cunnningham was president of the Australian Society of Archivists from 1998 to 2000.
He was founding convenor of the society's Collecting Archives Special Interest Group, and chair of the society's Descriptive Standards Committee.
He has held senior advisory positions for Comma: International Journal on Archives and Journal on Archival Organization.
On the ICA's Committee on Descriptive Standards he participated in developing the second editions on the ISAD(G) and ISAAR(CPF) standards, and of the draft Records in Contexts standard.
He was secretary of the ICA Committee on Descriptive Standards from 2002 to 2004.

Recognition

Cunningham has been acknowledged as a key figure in adopting and adapting modern approaches to macroappraisal in Australia.
Formal recognition includes:
2007: Fellow of the Australian Society of Archivists
2010: Emmett Leahy Award
The Emmett Leahy Award was given to recognize Cunningham's work in the National Archives of Australia and the International Council on Archives to promote collaboration in improving the practice of electronic records and information management, including leadership in developing the ICA's Principles and Functional Requirements for Records in Electronic Environments.
In accepting the Emmett Leahy Award, Cunningham said,

In November 2019 Simon Chu, Adrian Cunningham and Nolda Römer-Kenepa were awarded Fellowships by the International Council on Archives.

Publications

Cunnningham has written more than 60 articles on archives and recordkeeping standards.
His publications include:

Notes

Citations

Sources

1960 births
Living people
Australian archivists